Christian Jeffrey Dieterich (born July 27, 1958) is a retired American football player who played his entire career with the Detroit Lions from 1980 to 1986.

Early life and college career
Dieterich attended Ward Melville High School, earning the Long Island Newsday Hansen Award in 1975. At North Carolina State he was a two time all All ACC Tackle/Guard and was on the 1979 ACC Championship team, playing in the 1980 Hula Bowl.

Professional career

Dieterich played his entire seven season career with the Detroit Lions.

Personal life
Lives in Myrtle Beach, South Carolina. Dieterich writes Football & Mystery Books and donates the proceeds to Children & Animal Charities. Visit Website

1958 births
Living people
American football offensive guards
American football offensive tackles
Detroit Lions players
NC State Wolfpack football players
People from Stony Brook, New York
Players of American football from New York (state)
Sportspeople from Suffolk County, New York
Ward Melville High School alumni